Doordarshan Eti Jantra is a 2016 Indian Assamese language period comedy drama film directed by Rajesh Bhuyan and produced by Sanjiv Narain under the banner of AM Television. The story is based on National School of Drama's alumnus Himanshu Prasad Das's play Ekhon Gaonot Eta TV Asil.  Director Rajesh Bhuyan is also the co screenplay writer along with Santanu Rowmuria. The original playwright Himanshu Prasad Das, and Santanu Rowmuria wrote the dialogues of the film.   The film stars many of the renowned actors of Assamese film industry including Jatin Bora, Utpal Das, Prastuti Parashar and Moonmi Phukan in lead role. Released on 2 September 2016 in almost 50 theaters in Assam and Meghalaya (Shillong), the film has already become a superhit in Assam.

Plot
A story that dates back to the '80s. An unusual machine makes an entry into a village. It is called TV. It provokes a huge ruckus with people from all over scrambling to have a look at this black and white TV stationed at the most wealthiest of village households.

A group of enthusiastic villagers getting together to dug a hole beside the house, setting up a bamboo pole where an antenna is mounted on top of it, the mechanic turning the antenna back and forth, the visuals coming out right occasionally but most times it looks as though there is a blizzard going on, with people of all shapes and sizes assembling on the floor – these are but some of the cherished moments that naturally unfolded when TV made its debut in this village.

Cast
 Jatin Bora  as Kailash
 Prastuti Parashar as Purnima
 Utpal Das as Bitul
 Moonmi Phukan as Selima
 Moitryee Goswami as Malati
 Saurabh Hazarika as Malati's husband
 Chetana Das as Kailash's neighbor (Guest appearance )
 Siddhartha Sharma as Bitul's uncle (police officer)
 Prosenjit Bora
 Pranami Bora 
 Alokjyoti Saikia
 Himanshu Prasad Das
 Lakhi Borthakur
 Rajib Kro
 Bijit Dev Chowdhury
 Manmath Barua
 Tridiv Lahon

Reception

Rating

Soundtrack

The music of the movie is composed by Mousam Gogoi.

World Television Premier
The film had its world television premiere on Prag News on 16 April 2017 at 12:30 PM IST.

Awards

References

External links
 
 Doordarshan Eti Jantra at Amar Asom
 Doordarshan Eti Jantra  in Sadin
 Doordarshan Eti Jantra at the Bookmyshow
 Doordarshan Eti Jantra in PVR Cinemas
 Doordarshan Eti Jantra Official Trailer on YouTube
 Doordarshan Eti Jantra  in Asomiya Pratidin Newspaper

2010s Assamese-language films